Ducati is an Italian motorcycle-manufacturing company that is part of the Ducati group, and is headquartered in Bologna, Italy. The company is directly owned by Italian automotive manufacturer Lamborghini, whose German parent company is Audi, itself owned by the Volkswagen Group.

History
In 1926 Antonio Cavalieri Ducati and his three sons, Adriano, Marcello, and Bruno, founded Società Scientifica Radiobrevetti Ducati (SSR Ducati) in Bologna to produce vacuum tubes, condensers and other radio components. In 1935 they had become successful enough to enable construction of a new factory in the Borgo Panigale area of the city.  Production was maintained during World War II, despite the Ducati factory being a repeated target of Allied bombing. It was finally destroyed by around 40 Consolidated B-24 Liberators on 12 October 1944 as part of the United States Army Air Forces's Operation Pancake, which involved some 700 aircraft flying from airfields in the Province of Foggia.

Meanwhile, at the small Turinese firm SIATA (Società Italiana per Applicazioni Tecniche Auto-Aviatorie), Aldo Farinelli began developing a small pushrod engine for mounting on bicycles. Barely a month after the official liberation of Italy in 1944, SIATA announced its intention to sell this engine, called the "Cucciolo" (Italian for "puppy," in reference to the distinctive exhaust sound) to the public. The first Cucciolos were available alone, to be mounted on standard bicycles, by the buyer; however, businessmen soon bought the little engines in quantity, and offered complete motorized-bicycle units for sale.

In 1950, after more than 200,000 Cucciolos had been sold, in collaboration with SIATA, the Ducati firm finally offered its own Cucciolo-based motorcycle. Ducati soon dropped the Cucciolo name in favor of "55M" and "65TL".

When the market moved toward larger motorcycles, Ducati management decided to respond, making an impression at an early-1952 Milan show, introducing their 65TS cycle and Cruiser (a four-stroke motor scooter). Despite being described as the most interesting new machine at the 1952 show, the Cruiser was not a great success, and only a few thousand were made over a two-year period before the model ceased production.

In 1953, management split the company into two separate entities, Ducati Meccanica SpA and Ducati Elettronica, in acknowledgment of its diverging motorcycle and electronics product lines. Dr. Giuseppe Montano took over as head of Ducati Meccanica SpA and the Borgo Panigale factory was modernized with government assistance. By 1954, Ducati Meccanica SpA had increased production to 120 bikes a day.

In the 1960s, Ducati earned its place in motorcycling history by producing the fastest 250 cc road bike then available, the Mach 1. In the 1970s Ducati began producing motorcycles with large-displacement V-twin engines, which Ducati branded as "L-twin" for their 90° angle, and in 1973, introduced their trademarked desmodromic valve design. In 1985, Cagiva bought Ducati and planned to rebadge Ducati motorcycles with the "Cagiva" name. By the time the purchase was completed, Cagiva kept the "Ducati" name on its motorcycles. Eleven years later, in 1996, Cagiva accepted the offer from Texas Pacific Group and sold a 51% stake in the company for US$325 million; then, in 1998, Texas Pacific Group bought most of the remaining 49% to become the sole owner of Ducati. In 1999, TPG issued an initial public offering of Ducati stock and renamed the company "Ducati Motor Holding SpA". TPG sold over 65% of its shares in Ducati, leaving TPG the majority shareholder. In December 2005, Ducati returned to Italian ownership with the sale of Texas Pacific's stake (minus one share) to Investindustrial Holdings, the investment fund of Carlo and Andrea Bonomi.

In April 2012, Volkswagen Group's Audi subsidiary announced its intention to buy Ducati for € (US$). Volkswagen chairman Ferdinand Piëch, a motorcycle enthusiast, had long coveted Ducati, and had regretted that he passed up an opportunity to buy the company from the Italian government in 1984. Analysts doubted a tiny motorcycle maker would have a meaningful effect on a company the size of Volkswagen, commenting that the acquisition has "a trophy feel to it," and, "is driven by VW's passion for nameplates rather than industrial or financial logic". Italian luxury car brand Lamborghini was strengthened under VW ownership. AUDI AG's Automobili Lamborghini S.p.A. subsidiary acquired 100 percent of the shares of Ducati Motor Holding S.p.A. on 19 July 2012 for € (US$).

Ownership 
Since 1926, Ducati has been owned by a number of groups and companies.
 1926–1950 – Ducati family
 1950–1967 – Government Istituto per la Ricostruzione Industriale (IRI) management
 1967–1978 – Government EFIM management (control over day-to-day factory operations)
 1967–1973 – Headed By Giuseppe Montano
 1973–1978 – Headed by Cristiano de Eccher
 1978–1985 – VM Group
 1985–1996 – Cagiva Group
 1996–2005 – Texas-Pacific Group (US-based) ownership and going public
 Headed by CEO Federico Minoli, 1996–2001; returning for 2003–2007
 2005–2008 – Investindustrial Holdings S.p.A.
 2008–2012 – Performance Motorcycles S.p.A.
An investment vehicle formed by Investindustrial Holdings, BS Investimenti and Hospitals of Ontario Pension Plan
 19 July 2012 – present – Automobili Lamborghini S.p.A.
AUDI AG acquired 100% of the voting rights of Ducati Motor Holding S.p.A. via Audi's Automobili Lamborghini S.p.A. subsidiary

 From the 1960s to the 1990s, the Spanish company MotoTrans licensed Ducati engines and produced motorcycles that, although they incorporated subtle differences, were clearly Ducati-derived. MotoTrans's most notable machine was the 250 cc 24 Horas (Spanish for "24 hours").

Motorcycle designs

Ducati is best known for high-performance motorcycles characterized by large-capacity four-stroke, 90° V-twin engines, with a desmodromic valve design. Ducati branded his configuration as L-twin because one cylinder is vertical while the other is horizontal, making it look like a letter "L". Ducati's desmodromic valve design is nearing its 50th year of use. Desmodromic valves are closed with a separate, dedicated cam lobe and lifter instead of the conventional valve springs used in most internal combustion engines in consumer vehicles. This allows the cams to have a more radical profile, thus opening and closing the valves more quickly without the risk of valve-float, which causes a loss of power that is likely when using a "passive" closing mechanism under the same conditions.

While most other manufacturers use wet clutches (with the spinning parts bathed in oil) Ducati previously used multiplate dry clutches in many of their motorcycles. The dry clutch eliminates the power loss from oil viscosity drag on the engine, even though the engagement may not be as smooth as the oil-bath versions, but the clutch plates can wear more rapidly.  Ducati has converted to wet clutches across their current product lines.

Ducati also extensively uses a trellis frame, although Ducati's MotoGP project broke with this tradition by introducing a revolutionary carbon fibre frame for the Ducati Desmosedici GP9.

Product history

The chief designer of most Ducati motorcycles in the 1950s was Fabio Taglioni (1920–2001). His designs ranged from the small single-cylinder machines that were successful in the Italian 'street races' to the large-capacity twins of the 1980s. Ducati introduced the Pantah in 1979; its engine was updated in the 1990s in the Ducati SuperSport (SS) series. All modern Ducati engines are derivatives of the Pantah, which uses a toothed belt to actuate the engine's valves. Taglioni used the Cavallino Rampante (identified with the Ferrari brand) on his Ducati motorbikes. Taglioni chose this emblem of courage and daring as a sign of respect and admiration for Francesco Baracca, a World War I fighter pilot who died during an air raid in 1918.

1950s

1960s

1970s

In 1973, Ducati commemorated its 1972 win at the Imola 200 with the production model green frame Ducati 750 SuperSport.

Ducati also targeted the offroad market with the two-stroke Regolarità 125, building 3,486 models from 1975 to 1979, but the bike was not successful.

In 1975, the company introduced the 860 GT, designed by noted car stylist Giorgetto Giugiaro. Its angular lines were unique, but raised handlebars made for an uncomfortable seating position at high speeds and also caused steering issues. The 860GT's angular styling was a sales disaster, and it was hurriedly re-designed for the 1976 season with a more rounded fuel tank.

In 1975 Ducati offered hand-built production racers, the 'square case' 750SS and later 900SS models, built in limited numbers.  Sales of the 900SS proved so strong, and sales of the 860GT/GTE/GTS so weak, that production of the 900SS was ramped up, and it became Ducati's #1 selling model.

1980s

Ducati's liquid-cooled, multi-valve 90° V-twins, made from 1985 on, are known as Desmoquattro ("desmodromic valve four"). These include the 851, 916 and 996, 999 and a few predecessors and derivatives.

The Ducati Paso was introduced in 1986 with the Paso 750, followed in 1989 with the Paso 906. The final version came in 1991 with the 907IE (Iniezione Elettronica), now without the name "Paso". The design was from the hand of Massimo Tamburini, who also designed the Ducati 916 and MV Agusta F4. The Paso was a typical "you love it, you hate it" bike. However, at that time it looked like that all-enclosed bodywork would be the future for all motorcycles. The Paso design was copied for the Moto Morini Dart 400 and Cagiva Freccia 125. Together with Tamburini's Bimota DB1, they were enormously influential in terms of styling.

1990s
In 1993, Miguel Angel Galluzzi introduced the Ducati Monster, a naked bike with exposed trellis and engine. Today the Monster accounts for almost half of the company's worldwide sales. The Monster has undergone the most changes of any motorcycle that Ducati has ever produced.

In 1993, Pierre Terblanche, Massimo Bordi and Claudio Domenicali designed the Ducati Supermono. A 550 cc single-cylinder lightweight "Catalog Racer". Only 67 were built between 1993 and 1997.

In 1994, the company introduced the Ducati 916 model designed by Massimo Tamburini, a water-cooled version that allowed for higher output levels and a striking new bodywork that had aggressive lines, an underseat exhaust, and a single-sided swingarm. Ducati has since ceased production of the 916, supplanting it (and its progeny, the 748, 996 and 998) with the 749 and 999.

2000s
In 2006, the retro-styled Ducati PaulSmart 1000 LE was released, which shared styling cues with the 1973 750 SuperSport (itself a production replica of Paul Smart's 1972 race winning 750 Imola Desmo), as one of a SportClassic series representing the 750 GT, 750 Sport, and 750 SuperSport Ducati motorcycles.
 Monster: 620, 695, 696, 750, 796, 900, S2R, S4R
 Streetfighter S
 ST2, ST3, ST4
 Paul Smart 1000LE and SportClassic variants
 SuperSport 750, 900, 1000
 748, 749, 848
 996, 998, 999, 1098, 1098S, 1098R, 1198
 Desmosedici RR

Current lineup

 Monster
 Monster
 Monster+
 Monster 821
 Monster 821 Stealth
 Monster 1200
 Monster 1200 S

 Multistrada
 Multistrada 950
 Multistrada 950S
 Multistrada V4
 Multistrada V4 S
 Multistrada V4 S Sport
 Multistrada 1260 Enduro

 Diavel
 Diavel 1260
 Diavel 1260 S
 Diavel 1260 Lamborghini
 XDiavel
 XDiavel S
 XDiavel Black Star

 Panigale
 Panigale V2
 Panigale V4
 Panigale V4 S
 Panigale V4 SP
 Panigale V4 R
 Superleggera V4

 Streetfighter
 Streetfighter V4
 Streetfighter V4 S
 Streetfighter V2

 SuperSport
 SuperSport
 SuperSport S

 Hypermotard
 Hypermotard 950
 Hypermotard 950 SP
 Hypermotard 950 RVE

 Scrambler
 Scrambler 1100 Pro
 Scrambler 1100 Sport Pro
 Scrambler 1100 Dark Pro
 Scrambler Nightshift
 Scrambler Full Throttle
 Scrambler Café Racer
 Scrambler Desert Sled
 Scrambler Icon
 Scrambler Icon Dark
 Scrambler Sixty2

Current engines

 Desmodue: Desmodromic two-valve, air-cooled, 90° V-twin, 60° included valve angle (Scrambler, Monster 695, 797)
 Desmodue Evoluzione: Desmo two-valve, air-cooled (Hypermotard 1100 Evo, Monster 1100 Evo, Scrambler 1100)
 Testastretta 11°: Desmo four-valve, liquid-cooled, 90° V-twin, 11° valve overlap angle (Supersport/Supersport S, Hypermotard/Hyperstrada 939, Multistrada 950, Monster 821)
 Testastretta 11° DS: Desmo four-valve, liquid-cooled, 90° V-twin, 11° valve overlap angle, dual ignition (Monster 1200, Diavel)
 Testastretta 1262 DVT: Desmo four-valve, liquid-cooled, 90° V-twin, variable valve timing, longer stroke, smaller bore, re-tuned for high torque@lower 5000rpm peak 152-162hp - 126-135Nm Torque dual ignition (XDiavel, Diavel 1260 2019–Present, Multistrada1260 DVT)
 Superquadro: Desmo four-valve, liquid cooled, 90° V-twin,  (Panigale 959, 1299, V2 & Streetfighter V2)
Desmosedici Stradale: Desmo four-valve, liquid cooled, 90° V4 with a displacement of 1,103 cm³ and counter-rotating crankshaft (214–226 hp) (Panigale V4/S/S Corse/Speciale)
Desmosedici Stradale R: Desmo four-valve, liquid cooled, 90° V4 with a displacement of 998 cm³ and counter-rotating crankshaft (221–234 hp) (Panigale V4R)
V4 Granturismo: Four-valve, liquid-cooled, 90° V4 with a displacement of 1,158 cm³ and counter-rotating crankshaft (170 hp) (Multistrada V4)

Past engines
 Desmodue DS: Desmo two-valve, air-cooled, 56° included valve angle, dual ignition (Hypermotard 1100, Multistrada 1000/1100, Monster 1100, Monster S2R 1000, SportClassic GT 1000, SuperSport 1000)
 Desmodue LC: Desmo two-valve, liquid-cooled (ST2)
 Desmotre DS: Desmo three-valve, liquid-cooled, 40° included valve angle, dual ignition (ST3)
 Desmoquattro: Desmo four-valve, liquid-cooled, 40° included valve angle, (851, 888, 916, 996, 748, Monster S4, Monster S4R, ST4, ST4s)
 Testastretta: Desmo four-valve, liquid-cooled, 25° included valve angle, (996R, 998, 999, 749, Monster S4R Testastretta)
 Testastretta Evoluzione: Desmo four-valve, liquid-cooled, 24.3° included valve angle, 41° valve overlap angle (848, 1098/1198, Streetfighter 1098)
 Testastretta 11° DVT: Desmo four-valve, liquid-cooled, 90° V-twin, variable valve timing, dual ignition (Multistrada 1200 DVT)

Motorcycle design history
Ducati has produced several styles of motorcycle engines, including varying the number of cylinders, type of valve actuation and fuel delivery. Ducati is best known for its 90° V-twin engine, used on nearly all Ducatis since the 1970s. Ducati brands its engine as "L-twin", emphasizing the 90° V angle, to create product differentiation from competing V-twin motorcycles. Ducati has also made other engine types, mostly before the 1970s, with one, two, three, or four cylinders; operated by pull rod valves and push rod valves; single, double and triple overhead camshafts; two-stroke and even at one stage manufactured small diesel engines, many of which were used to power boats, generators, garden machinery and emergency pumps (for example, for fire fighting). The engines were the IS series from  air-cooled and the larger twin DM series water- and air-cooled. The engines have been found in all parts of the globe. Wisconsin Diesel even assembled and "badge engineered" the engines in the USA. They have also produced outboard motors for marine use. Currently, Ducati makes no other engines except for its motorcycles.

On current Ducati motors, except for the Desmosedici and 1199 Panigale, the valves are actuated by a standard valve cam shaft which is rotated by a timing belt driven by the motor directly. The teeth on the belt keep the camshaft drive pulleys indexed. On older Ducati motors, prior to 1986, drive was by solid shaft that transferred to the camshaft through bevel-cut gears. This method of valve actuation was used on many of Ducati's older single-cylinder motorcycles — the shaft tube is visible on the outside of the cylinder.

Ducati is also famous for using the desmodromic valve system championed by engineer and designer Fabio Taglioni, though the firm has also used engines that use valve springs to close their valves. In the early days, Ducati reserved the desmodromic valve heads for its higher performance bikes and its race bikes. These valves do not suffer from valve float at high engine speeds, thus a desmodromic engine is capable of far higher revolutions than a similarly configured engine with traditional spring-valve heads.

In the 1960s and 1970s, Ducati produced a wide range of small two-stroke bikes, mainly sub-100 cc capacities. Large quantities of some models were exported to the United States.

Ducati has produced the following motorcycle engine types:
 Single-cylinder,
pullrod actuated, 48 cc and 65 cc (Cucciolo)
pushrod actuated, 98 and 125 cc
two-stroke, 50, 80, 90, 100, 125 cc
bevel actuated, spring valved: 98 cc, 100 cc, 125 cc, 160 cc, 175 cc, 200 cc, 239 cc, 250 cc, 350 cc, 450 cc
bevel actuated, desmodromic valved: 125 cc, 239 cc, 250 cc, 350 cc and 450 cc
belt actuated, desmodromic valved: 549/572 cc Supermono, only 65 made.
 Two-cylinder,
bevel actuated, spring valved 90 ° V-twin: 750 cc, 860 cc
bevel actuated, desmo valved 90 ° V-twin: 750 cc, 860 cc, 900 cc, 973 cc (Mille)
bevel actuated, desmo valved parallel twin: 125 cc
chain actuated, spring valved parallel twin: 350 cc, 500 cc (GTL)
chain actuated, desmo valved parallel twin): 500 cc (500SD)
belt actuated, desmo valved 90 ° V-twin: Almost all engines since 1986.
 Four-cylinder,
gear actuated, desmo valved (V4): Prototype Desmosedici, and Low volume Production Desmosedici RR, 1,500 made
pushrod actuated, spring valved (V4): Prototype Apollo, only two made.

Enthusiasts groups
A key part of Ducati's marketing strategy since the 1990s has been fostering a distinct community identity in connection with branding efforts including online communities and local, regional and national Ducati enthusiast clubs. There are more than 400 Ducati clubs worldwide and 20,000 registered users of the Ducati Owners Club web site and 17,000 subscribers to the racing web site. Enthusiasts and riders are informally referred to in the motorcycling community as Ducatista (singular) or Ducatisti (plural).

In North America there are several Ducati enthusiasts organizations with varying degrees of factory sponsorship, such as the Bay Area Desmo Owners Club (BADOC) located in and around the city of San Francisco, CA. Ducati Riders of Illinois (DRILL) located in Chicago, IL. DESMO, the Ducati Enthusiast Sport Motorcycle Organization, is a North American group affiliated with the factory Desmo Owners Club. Some groups are focused on vintage Ducatis while several are based primarily or entirely on email discussion lists or web forums.

Merchandising
Ducati has a wide range of accessories, lifestyle products and co-branded merchandise bearing their logos and designs. The company has a licensing agreement with Tumi Inc., launching a collection of eight co-branded luggage pieces in 2006, sold through both of the brands' retail outlets.

Racing history

Ducati's history with motorsport began with speed records on Cucciolo motorized bicycle factory racers in 1951, followed in 1954 with bringing in Fabio Taglioni to found a road-racing program with the 100 Gran Sport. , Ducati was still pursuing the "win on Sunday, sell on Monday" business model and spending 10% of company revenues, €, on its racing business.

MotoGP World Championship
On 23 September 2007, Casey Stoner clinched his and Ducati's first Grand Prix World Championship.

At the time Ducati was the fastest bike.

For , Ducati Marlboro Team campaigned their Desmosedici GP9 with former World Champions Casey Stoner and Nicky Hayden. Ducati also supplied customer bikes to Pramac Racing, with Mika Kallio and Niccolò Canepa riding for the team in 2009.

Rossi returned to the Yamaha team for the 2013 season.

For , Ducati Team raced with Nicky Hayden and the Italian rider Andrea Dovizioso. In 2014 Cal Crutchlow teamed up with Dovizioso for the season, and he left at the end of the year.

In , Ducati Team, under the control of the new race team director Gigi Dall'Igna and the new Desmosedici GP15, raced with two Italian riders: Andrea Dovizioso and Andrea Iannone. As well as this, Casey Stoner also tested Ducati machinery during the season.

In 2019, Danilo Petrucci joined Dovizioso at the factory team.

In , Despite suffering five DNF's, four of which were individual errors throughout the 2022 season, Bagnaia became the newest MotoGP world champion today in Valencia. The Ducati rider also became the Italian manufacturer's second-ever MotoGP champion after Casey Stoner, and first in 15 years.

Superbike World Championship (SBK)
The company has won 15 riders world championships and 18 manufacturers world championships, competing since the series' inception in 1988. At the end of 2015, Ducati has amassed 318 wins, more than any other manufacturer involved in the championship.

Supersport World Championship

FIM Superstock 1000 Cup

Ducati has also won the manufacturers' championship for years 2008–2009, 2011 and 2016.

British Superbike Championship
Ducati has won the British Superbike Championship twelve times.

AMA Superbike Championship
In the AMA Superbike Championship, Ducati has had its share of success, with Doug Polen winning the title in 1993 and Troy Corser the following year in 1994. Ducati has entered a bike in every AMA Superbike season since 1986, but withdrew from the series after the 2006 season.

Ducati had an important place in early Superbike racing history in the United States and vice versa: In 1977, Cycle magazine editors Cook Neilson and Phil Schilling took a Ducati 750SS to first place at Daytona in the second-ever season of AMA Superbike racing. "Neilson retired from racing at the end of the year, but the bike he and Schilling built — nicknamed Old Blue for its blue livery — became a legend," says Richard Backus from Motorcycle Classics: "How big a legend? Big enough for Ducati to team with Italian specialty builder NCR to craft a limited-edition update, New Blue, based on the 2007 Sport 1000S, and big enough to inspire the crew at the Barber Vintage Motorsports Museum (see Barber Motorsports Park), arguably one of the most important motorcycle museums in the world, to commission Ducati specialist Rich Lambrechts to craft a bolt-by-bolt replica for its collection. The finished bike's name? Deja Blue."

Australian Superbike Championship

Formula TT
Ducati's first ever world title was the 1978 TT Formula 1 World Championship, achieved thanks to Mike Hailwood's victory at the Isle of Man TT. Between 1981 and 1984 Tony Rutter won four TT Formula 2 World Championships riding Ducati bikes.

See also
 List of Italian companies
 List of motorcycle manufacturers

References

External links

 
 
 
 

 
Italian brands
Motorcycle manufacturers of Italy
Moped manufacturers
Vehicle manufacturing companies established in 1926
Italian companies established in 1926
Audi
Volkswagen Group
Engine manufacturers of Italy
Electric vehicle manufacturers of Italy
Scooter manufacturers
Cycle manufacturers of Italy
Electric bicycles